Moabite may refer to:

 Moabites, the people of the Kingdom of Moab, in modern-day Jordan
 Moabite language, an extinct Canaanite dialect once spoken in Moab
 Ithmah the Moabite, one of King David's Mighty Warriors
 Ruth the Moabite, the main character in the Book of Ruth

See also
 
 Moab (disambiguation)
 Moabi (disambiguation)
 Moabit, a neighborhood in Berlin, Germany